John Phillip Jumper (born February 4, 1945) is a retired United States Air Force general, who served as 17th Chief of Staff of the United States Air Force from September 6, 2001 to September 2, 2005.  He retired from the Air Force on  November 1, 2005. Jumper was succeeded as Chief of Staff by General T. Michael Moseley.

Background
Jumper was born in Paris, Texas. He earned his commission as a distinguished graduate of Virginia Military Institute's Air Force ROTC program in 1966. He has commanded a fighter squadron, two fighter wings, a numbered Air Force, and U.S. Air Forces in Europe and Allied Air Forces Central Europe. Prior to becoming Chief of Staff of the Air Force, the general served as Commander of Air Combat Command at Langley Air Force Base.

Jumper has also served at the Pentagon as Deputy Chief of Staff for Air and Space Operations, as the Senior Military Assistant to two secretaries of defense, and as Special Assistant to the Chief of Staff for Roles and Missions. A command pilot with more than 5,000 flying hours, principally in fighter aircraft, Jumper served two tours in Southeast Asia, accumulating more than 1,400 combat hours.

Jumper retired from the Air Force on November 1, 2005.

In June 2007 Jumper joined Board of Directors of Science Applications International Corporation, a federal contractor company. 
On March 1, 2012 Jumper became SAIC's CEO and was essential in splitting the company into two. After the split Jumper remained the CEO of the company which changed its name to Leidos. Jumper retired as CEO in July 2014, when Roger Krone succeeded him as the company's new CEO, but Jumper stayed on as chairman of the company's board of directors.

Education
1962 Hampton High School (Hampton, Virginia)
1966 Bachelor of Science degree in electrical engineering, Virginia Military Institute, Lexington
1975 Squadron Officer School, Maxwell AFB, Alabama
1978 Air Command and Staff College, Maxwell AFB, Alabama
1979 Master of Business Administration degree, Golden Gate University, San Francisco, California
1982 National War College, Fort Lesley J. McNair, Washington, D.C.

Assignments
June 1966 – July 1967, student pilot, 3550th Pilot Training Squadron, Moody Air Force Base, Georgia
July 1967 – September 1967, C-7 upgrade training, Sewart AFB, Tennessee
October 1967 – October 1968, C-7 pilot, 459th Tactical Airlift Squadron, Phu Cat Air Base, South Vietnam
November 1968 – July 1969, F-4 upgrade training, 431st Tactical Fighter Squadron, George AFB, California
July 1969 – May 1970, instructor pilot, weapons officer and fast forward air controller, 555th Tactical Fighter Squadron, Udon Royal Thai AFB, Thailand
June 1970 – July 1974, instructor pilot, flight examiner and standardization and evaluation chief, 81st Tactical Fighter Wing, Royal Air Force Bentwaters, England
July 1974 – August 1977, flight instructor, later, flight commander, U.S. Air Force Fighter Weapons School, Nellis Air Force Base, Nevada
August 1977 – June 1978, student, Air Command and Staff College, Maxwell Air Force Base, Alabama
June 1978 – August 1981, Staff Officer for Operations and Readiness, Tactical Division, Headquarters U.S. Air Force, Washington, D.C.
August 1981 – July 1982, student, National War College, Fort Lesley J. McNair, Washington, D.C.
July 1982 – February 1983, Chief of Safety, 474th Tactical Fighter Wing, Nellis AFB, Nevada
March 1983 – July 1983, Commander, 430th Tactical Fighter Squadron, Nellis AFB, Nevada
July 1983 – August 1986, Special Assistant and Executive Officer to the Commander, Headquarters Tactical Air Command, Langley AFB, Virginia
August 1986 – February 1988, Vice Commander, later, Commander, 33rd Tactical Fighter Wing, Eglin Air Force Base, Florida
February 1988 – May 1990, Commander, 57th Fighter Weapons Wing, Nellis AFB, Nevada
June 1990 – April 1992, Deputy Director for Politico-Military Affairs, Strategic Plans and Policy Directorate, the Joint Staff, Washington, D.C.
May 1992 – February 1994, Senior Military Assistant to the Secretary of Defense, Washington, D.C.
February 1994 – July 1994, Special Assistant to the Air Force Chief of Staff for Roles and Missions, Washington, D.C.
August 1994 – June 1996, Commander, 9th Air Force and U.S. Central Command Air Forces, Shaw Air Force Base, South Carolina
June 1996 – November 1997, Deputy Chief of Staff for Air and Space Operations, Headquarters U.S. Air Force, Washington, D.C.
December 1997 – February 2000, Commander, U.S. Air Forces in Europe, and Commander, Allied Air Forces Central Europe, Ramstein AB, Germany
February 2000 – September 2001, Commander, Headquarters ACC, Langley Air Force Base, Virginia
September 2001 – September 2005, Chief of Staff, Headquarters U.S. Air Force, Washington, D.C.

Television
Jumper appeared as himself in the Stargate SG-1 episode "Lost City: Part 2".

Flight information
Rating: Command pilot
Flight hours: More than 5,000
Aircraft flown: C-7, C-17, C-20, C-37, T-37, T-38, F-4, F-15, F-16, F-22A and Eurofighter Typhoon.

Awards and decorations

2000 Air Force Order of the Sword, U.S. Air Forces in Europe (USAFE press release)

Effective dates of promotion

Tanker Lease Scandal
On June 7, 2005 General Jumper apologized to Senator McCain for internal Air Force emails about the Senator in the context of the tanker lease scandal, calling them "unprofessional and not worthy of a great Air Force."

Thunderbirds "Thundervision" Scandal
Members of the United States Air Force were under investigation by the FBI for having awarded a $50 million contract for audio-visual presentation services to Strategic Message Solutions of Plymouth Meeting, Pa. The contract involved the "Thundervision" project, meant to provide oversized video screens and perhaps content services during air shows that featured the Air Force Thunderbirds.  The investigation revolves around possible involvement of Jumper, and then Chief of Staff of the Air Force T. Michael Moseley. It was suggested that the contract price was inflated, because a friend of the two generals, Air Force General (ret.) Hal Hornburg, was associated with Strategic Message Solutions.  Two companies involved in the bidding process protested award of the contract, one having offered comparable services for half as much.  The Air Force later cancelled the contract.

See also
List of commanders of USAFE

Notes

External links
Biography of General Jumper, USAF, September 2005.

Interview with General Jumper: Air Force Transformation, Military Aerospace Technology, May 1, 2002.
First-year cadet criticizes USAF Chief of Staff's personnel decisions, Snopes, March 26, 2003.
Speech at the Air Force Association convention, September 16, 2003.
Speech at the Air Force Association symposium, February 12, 2004.

1945 births
Living people
People from Paris, Texas
Virginia Military Institute alumni
United States Air Force personnel of the Vietnam War
Recipients of the Air Medal
Recipients of the Distinguished Flying Cross (United States)
Golden Gate University alumni
Hampton High School (Virginia) alumni
National War College alumni
Recipients of the Legion of Merit
United States Air Force generals
Recipients of the Defense Superior Service Medal
Chiefs of Staff of the United States Air Force
Recipients of the Air Force Distinguished Service Medal
Recipients of the Distinguished Service Medal (US Army)
Recipients of the Navy Distinguished Service Medal
Recipients of the Coast Guard Distinguished Service Medal
Recipients of the Defense Distinguished Service Medal
Commandeurs of the Légion d'honneur
Recipients of the Order of the Sword (United States)
Military personnel from Texas